Great Madrasah may refer to:
 Great Madrasah (1573-1940) in Nicosia, Cyprus
 Great Madrasah (1924-1941) in Skopje, North Macedonia
 Great Madrasah (1771) in Yatağan, Turkey